Kankinara (Code: KNR) is a railway station in North 24 Parganas district in the Indian state of West Bengal, which serves Bhatpara town. It lies on the Sealdah–Ranaghat line and is part of the Kolkata Suburban Railway system and is under the jurisdiction of Eastern Railway.

History
The Calcutta (Sealdah)–Kusthia line of Eastern Bengal Railway was opened to traffic in 1862. Eastern Bengal Railway worked on the eastern side of the Hooghly River.

Station complex
The platform is not very well sheltered. It has many facilities including water and sanitation. This railway station can be reached via the Amdanga Road in Bhatpara.

Electrification
The Sealdah–Ranaghat sector was electrified in 1963–64.

Gallery

References

External links

 Trains from Kankinara to Sealdah
 Trains from Sealdah to Kankinara
 

Railway stations in North 24 Parganas district
Sealdah railway division
Transport in Kolkata
Kolkata Suburban Railway stations